Ukishima (written:  or ) is a Japanese surname. Notable people with the surname include:

, Japanese footballer and manager
, Japanese politician
, Japanese politician

See also
Ukishima Solar Power Plant, a power station in Kawasaki, Kanagawa Prefecture, Japan

Japanese-language surnames